Fanny Marguerite Judith Ardant (born 22 March 1949) is a French actress and film director. She is the recipient of numerous accolades, including two César Awards and a Lumières Award.

Early life 
Ardant was born in Saumur, Maine-et-Loire, France, to a military attaché father. She grew up in Monaco until age 17, when she moved to Aix-en-Provence to study at the Institut d'études politiques d'Aix-en-Provence. In her early twenties, her interest turned to acting and in 1974 she made her first appearance on stage.

Career 

By the early 1980s, Ardant was a major film star, gaining international recognition for her role opposite Gérard Depardieu in La Femme d'à côté (The Woman Next Door). The film, directed by François Truffaut, brought Ardant her first César Award nomination for best actress in 1982 and in 1984 she was nominated again for Vivement dimanche!. Eventually, she became Truffaut's partner, giving birth to their daughter, Joséphine Truffaut, on 28 September 1983. Initially, her youthful beauty brought popularity but over time her sophistication and acting skills made her one of France's most admired actresses. She proved her versatility, playing a comedic role in Pédale douce for which she won the 1997 César Award for Best Actress.

Fluent in English and Italian, Ardant has starred in several Hollywood and British films. Her most recent English-language film was the 2002 Franco Zeffirelli production Callas Forever, in which she portrayed opera diva Maria Callas. It opened the 14th Annual Palm Springs International Film Festival on 9 January 2003. In 2003, Ardant received the Stanislavsky Award at the 25th Moscow International Film Festival (for the outstanding achievement in the career of acting and devotion to the principles of Stanislavsky's school).

In 2009, she became a director and screenwriter, with Cendres et sang (Ashes and Blood). She also took part in a rare performance of Sardou's La Haine on 19 July 2009 at the Festival de Radio France et Montpellier Languedoc Roussillon, with Gérard Depardieu, the concert broadcast on France Musique.

In 2010, she directed a short feature, Absent Chimeras (Chimères absentes in French), in which she also stars. She made this short film in order to raise public awareness to the plight of Romani people in Europe, a cause she personally defends. In 2011, she starred in the music video for Elle me dit, the first French single by Lebanese singer Mika, and appeared in the play based on Joan Didion's 2005 novel The Year of Magical Thinking in the Théâtre de l'Atelier, Paris. She also starred in Interno Giorno that same year by Tommaso Rossellini, acting in both French and Italian. In 2013, she made a cameo appearance as herself in The Great Beauty.

In 2018, Ardant starred in the Swiss drama film Shock Waves – Diary of My Mind by Ursula Meier. It was screened in the Panorama section at the 68th Berlin International Film Festival. In 2019, Ardant directed the opera Lady Macbeth of Mtsensk at the Greek National Opera.

Personal life 
Fanny Ardant was the youngest of five children born to a cavalry officer and his wife. She was raised in Monte Carlo where she was educated at a convent school. A voracious reader, she discovered Proust at age 15 and felt as though his writings were for her.

When she was 27 her father died and the shock of his loss never left her. Shortly before his death Ardant started acting on stage. However following her father's death she followed his advice and went to university in Aix-en-Provence where she read Political Science. Upon graduation she took a job working for the French embassy in London from which she was sacked for poor time keeping and being dishevelled. The latter was attributed to the social whirl she enjoyed in London.

Ardant continued working odd jobs in London before deciding, almost on a whim, to go to drama school. She returned to France for her studies and before long began acting on stage and then on television. At the age of 31 she was contacted by François Truffaut who had spotted her in a television drama and wanted to cast her in The Woman Next Door. While working together Ardant and Truffaut fell in love and in 1983 she gave birth to their daughter Josephine. Truffaut died a year later from a brain tumour.

In 2009, Ardant signed a petition in support of director Roman Polanski, who had been detained while traveling to a film festival in relation to his 1977 sexual abuse charges, which the petition argued would undermine the tradition of film festivals as a place for works to be shown "freely and safely", and that arresting filmmakers traveling to neutral countries could open the door "for actions of which no-one can know the effects."

Selected filmography

Awards and nominations

References

External links 

 

1949 births
20th-century French actresses
21st-century French actresses
21st-century French screenwriters
Best Actress César Award winners
Best Actress Lumières Award winners
Best Supporting Actress César Award winners
European Film Award for Best Actress winners
French film actresses
French film directors
French stage actresses
French television actresses
French women film directors
French women screenwriters
Living people
People from Saumur
Sciences Po Aix alumni
Audiobook narrators